Taylor McKenzie (1931 – April 13, 2007) was the first Navajo medical doctor (since 1958), the Vice President of the Navajo Nation (1999–2003, under Kelsey A. Begaye), and the first Navajo Nation Chief Medical Officer (since 2006).

He was married to Betty McKenzie and they had nine children: Judith, Kathleen, Claire, Jeremy, Patrick, Marvin, Gilbert, Michael, and Edward. Son Edward is now a doctor at Presbyterian Hospital in Albuquerque, New Mexico, United States.

McKenzie was a graduate of Wheaton College in Illinois. He studied medicine at the Baylor University School of Medicine in Houston, Texas. He studied under the famous heart surgeon, Dr. Michael DeBakey after whom he named his first child, Michael.

References

External links
Taylor McKenzie, first Navajo surgeon, dies at 76
 Former Navajo Vice President Taylor McKenzie, 76, dies...
Hundreds Honor McKenzie
National Deaths: Taylor McKenzie

1931 births
2007 deaths
Vice Presidents of the Navajo Nation
20th-century Native Americans
21st-century Native Americans